VG1 or variant may refer to:

 Vg1 ribozyme, an RNA-based non-protein-based enzyme
 Volkssturmgewehr VG 1, a WWII German gun
 1969 VG1, a main belt asteroid discovered in 1969, named Kursk, the 3073rd asteroid registered
 (5371) 1987 VG1, a main belt asteroid discovered in 1987, the 5371st asteroid registered

See also
 VG-1 (disambiguation)
 VGL (disambiguation)
 VGI (disambiguation)
 VG (disambiguation)